In mathematics, specifically enumerative geometry, the virtual fundamental class  of a space  is a replacement of the classical fundamental class  in its chow ring which has better behavior with respect to the enumerative problems being considered. In this way, there exists a cycle with can be used for answering specific enumerative problems, such as the number of degree  rational curves on a quintic threefold. The non-compact "smooth" component is empty, but the boundary contains maps of curveswhose components consist of one degree 3 curve which contracts to a point. There is a virtual fundamental class which can then be used to count the number of curves in this family.

Geometric motivation 
We can understand the motivation for the definition of the virtual fundamental classpg 10 by considering what situation should be emulated for a simple case (such as a smooth complete intersection). Suppose we have a variety  (representing the coarse space of some moduli problem ) which is cut out from an ambient smooth space  by a section  of a rank- vector bundle . Then  has "virtual dimension"  (where  is the dimension of ).

If there is no obvious ambient space  for which there is an embedding, we must rely upon deformation theory techniques to construct this cycle on the moduli space representing the fundamental class. Now in the case where we have the section  cutting out , there is a four term exact sequencewhere the last term represents the "obstruction sheaf". Note the construction of Behrend-Fantechi is a dualization of the exact sequence given from the concrete example abovepg 44.

Remark on definitions and special cases 
There are multiple definitions of virtual fundamental classes, all of which are subsumed by the definition for morphisms of Deligne-Mumford stacks using the intrinsic normal cone and a perfect obstruction theory, but the first definitions are more amenable for constructing lower-brow examples for certain kinds of schemes, such as ones with components of varying dimension. In this way, the structure of the virtual fundamental classes becomes more transparent, giving more intuition for their behavior and structure.

Virtual fundamental class of an embedding into a smooth scheme 
One natural candidate for such an obstruction bundle if given byfor the divisors associated to a non-zero set of generators  for the ideal .

Remarks on the construction 
The first map in the definition of the Gysin morphism corresponds to specializing to the normal conepg 89, which is essentially the first part of the standard Gysin morphism, as defined in Fultonpg 90. But, because we are not working with smooth varieties, Fulton's cone construction doesn't work, since it would give , hence the normal bundle could act as the obstruction bundle. In this way, the intermediate step of using the specialization of the normal cone only keeps the intersection-theoretic data of  relevant to the variety .

See also 
 Chow group of a stack

References 

 Virtual fundamental classes, global normal cones and Fulton's canonical classes

Intersection theory